Nirel is a Tulu-language film directed by Ranjith Bajpe and produced jointly by Shodhan Prasad and San Poojary, starring Anoop Sagar, Varuna Shetty, Deepthi, Sachin Padil, Deepak Paladka . This will be the first film produced overseas and planned to shoot completely in Gulf Region. The film is based on the Kannada Script "Nadu Naduve" by Karthik Gowda and later converted to Tulu by Ranjith Bajpe. Karthik Gowda also wrote the screenplay for the movie, and dialogues written by Ranjith Bajpe. Cast for the movie was totally selected by an audition at Fortune Grand Hotel Dubai. The people behind "Nirel" is a group of four friends, San Poojary, Ranjith Bajpe, Rajneesh Amin and Sachin Padil.

Plot
The film revolves around 3 main characters played by Anoop Sagar as Sachin, Varuna as Rashmi & Deepthi as Shweta. Anoop is an engineer by profession but wants to be a film hero by passion. Varuna is an to-day independent girl and works as a banker for one of the banking organizations of Dubai. Deepthi plays a family friend to Anoop Sagar. The film deals about how the trio are linked, what happens when ambition, passions, likes, dislikes, over reactive nature comes ahead of relationships and other things. Told with a comical touch, the film then divulges to an emotional yet romantic tale.

Cast
 Anoop Sagar
 Varuna Shetty
 Deepthi Salian
 Sachin Padil
 Deepak Paladka
 Rajendra Pai
 Vidya
 Nindiya Prasad
 Ashok Palan
 Subhash
 Vishwapathi Bhat
 Anand Salian
 Sandhya Prasad
 Ramesh Aravind - Cameo
 Andria D'Souza as herself  - Special Appearance

Production
A team of 4 young guys, San Poojary, Ranjith Bajpe, Rajneesh Amin and Sachin Padil came together and planned to produce a youth oriented Tulu movie with fresh concept. They approached Shodhan Prasad and he agreed to produce the movie under Sandhya Creations. Movie name was launched at Tulu Parba 2012, a Tulu Cultural fest in Dubai, UAE by B. R. Shetty
Muhurtha of the movie was done on 24-10-2012 at producers residence by Mr. Sarvotham Shetty. In May, Sandalwood Actor Ramesh Aravind acted in a guest role for Nirel.

Soundtrack

Music released by Muzik247 Tulu
Song List

Critical reception
Movie was premiered at Golden Cinema, Dubai on 14 February 2014 on Valentine's Day. Upon release movie got positive response.

Movie also received 5 awards.

Tulu Cinemotsava Awards 2015
Best Film 
Best Supporting Actress - Deepthi Salian
Best Cameraman - Mani Kookal
Best Story - Karthik Gowda

RED FM Tulu Film Awards
 Special Award for First International Movie

Media Articles
List of media articles about "Nirel"
 Daijiworld Exclusive Interview of Ranjith Bajpe-Director of the movie.
 NewsKarnataka.com article - Shooting for Tulu Movie Nirel in full swing

List of Tulu Movies
List of tulu films of 2015
List of Tulu films of 2014
List of Released Tulu films
Tulu cinema

References

External links
 
 

2014 films
2014 romantic comedy films
Tulu-language films
Indian romantic comedy films